Amed S.F.K, (Amed Sports Activities Club) formerly Diyarbakır Büyükşehir Belediyespor, is a sports club based in Diyarbakır, Turkey.

History 
The club was established in 1972 and competed in the amateur leagues for many years as Melikahmet Turanspor, because of a sponsorship with Turan Gazozlar. The club colours were red and white. In 1985 the club name changed into Melikahmetspor after the sponsorship had ended.
 
The Diyarbakır municipality bought the club in 1990 and changed its name to "Diyarbakır Belediyespor". In October 2014, they changed their name to "Amedspor" without official approval, and therefore have been fined by the Turkish Football Federation (TFF). The objection of the TFF was because of the existence of the original Amedspor, which later on changed its name into Amidaspor. However, when the team changed its name to Amed Sportif Faaliyetler Kulübü, TFF announced that it accepted this new name.

In October 2022, Diyarbakir Bar Association has filed a criminal complaint against a military officer who is the commander of the gendarmerie force in the central province of Afyon, told the players of Afjet Afyonspor that he hoped, especially after a PKK terror attack in Mersin, that they would crush the opponent.

Before the Bursaspor match played on 5 March 2023, Amedspor players were attacked and some Bursaspor fans unfurled banners of Mahmut Yıldırım, codenamed as Yeşil (Turkish for "Green"), a Turkish rogue agent who is responsible for unresolved murders and photos of "Renault Toros" automobile, symbolizing forced disappearances and political murders in Turkey in 1990s. HDP said: “We condemn the racist attacks against Amedspor in Bursa. The atmosphere in which the spirits of the murderers of the 1990s and the residues of JİTEM roam will neither prevent Amedspor nor end the hope for peace. Those responsible must be held accountable before the law. We are the millions who will not kneel against fascism.” Diyarbakır Bar Association, in its criminal complaint regarding the events in the match, stated that crimes of inciting or humiliating the public to hatred and hostility, intentionally endangering general security, insulting and abuse of office were committed.

Crest and colours

Support 
In early 2016, Amedspor pulled off an upset win over Bursaspor to make it into quarterfinals of the Turkish Cup. After this victory their fans were banned from the following match against Fenerbahçe S.K. by the TFF. The TFF also suspended their midfielder Deniz Naki 12 games for supporting the peace in the Kurdish-Turkish conflict in a tweet and fined him with 19.500 TL (~6500$). Also the police raided the club's offices taking their computers on suspicion that a politically controversial Tweet might possibly have originated from there.

According to an interview which the German newspaper Die Zeit held with their representatives, the club experienced difficulties as the club was seen as a symbol of Kurdish nationalist identity by the TFF and Turkish authorities. The flag of Kurdistan is banned from the stadiums and since December 2015 the fans of Amedspor were banned from watching the away games in the regular season. After the ban about 500 fans went to watch their team without showing the colors of their team, but as they showed their emotions for their team when it scored a goal, they had trouble with the fans from the opposite team and the police and they had to leave before the end of the match. From January 2016 to February 2019 the fans were banned to watch away games from the male football team for 64 games. Fans of the Amed S.K. women's team were not allowed to watch away games from 2018 to February 2019. Also merchandise articles of the fans are also often seized by the police. Amedspor also has a women's volleyball Team.

Honours 
 TFF Third League
 Winners (2): 2006–07 (Group 1), 2012–13 (Group 1)

Current squad

Out on loan

Notes

References

External links
Amed SK on TFF.org

Association football clubs established in 1990
Football clubs in Turkey
1990 establishments in Turkey
Amed S.K.